Dry Tavern is a census-designated place in Jefferson Township, Greene County, Pennsylvania,  United States. It is located next to the borough of Rices Landing along Pennsylvania Route 88, on high ground south of the Monongahela River. As of the 2010 census the population was 697.

Etymology

Dry Tavern took its name from a local tavern which sold no alcohol.

Demographics

References

External links

Census-designated places in Greene County, Pennsylvania
Census-designated places in Pennsylvania